Lindsey House is a Grade II* listed villa in Cheyne Walk, Chelsea, London. It is owned by the National Trust but tenanted and only open by special arrangement.

This house should not be confused with the eponymous 1640 house in Lincoln's Inn Fields. That house came to be known as Lindsey House for its occupation in the 18th century by later Earls of Lindsey.

The gardens of Lindsey House are Grade II listed on the Register of Historic Parks and Gardens.

History
The house was built in 1674 by the third Earl of Lindsey on the riverside site of Thomas More's garden and is thought to be the oldest house in Kensington and Chelsea. It was extensively remodelled in 1750 by Count Zinzendorf for the Moravian community in London.

The house was divided into four separate dwellings in 1775. Today, it occupies nos. 96 to 101 of Cheyne Walk, covering a number of separate frontages and outbuildings. Previous residents have included the historical painter John Martin, in one of the outbuildings at 4 Lindsey Row from 1849–53 and James McNeill Whistler between 1866–78 at 2 Lindsey Row (now 96 Cheyne Walk). In 1808, engineer Marc Brunel lived in the middle section of the house (now no. 98), and his son Isambard Kingdom Brunel grew up here. These residencies are commemorated by Blue plaques on the walls of the house.

The house was separated from the river by the construction of the Chelsea Embankment, completed in 1874, as a part of Joseph Bazalgette's grand scheme to create a modern sewage system. 

One part of the house features a garden designed by Edwin Lutyens and Gertrude Jekyll in 1911 for the Irish art dealer Sir Hugh Lane, who bought the west wing of the house in 1909. This area is surrounded by statuary, a colonnade and a single flower border. The garden is said by Lennox-Boyd be "modest in its elements, quietly restful in its effect" and "to respect the simple formality of the house". In 2000, the garden was restored and a glazed garden room was added to the house by Marcus Beale Architects.

See also
Carlyle's House is a nearby NT property in Cheyne Row

References

Bibliography
The Story of Lindsey House, Chelsea Peter Kroyer

External links

 

Houses completed in 1674
History of the Royal Borough of Kensington and Chelsea
National Trust properties in London
Grade II* listed buildings in the Royal Borough of Kensington and Chelsea
Grade II listed parks and gardens in London
Grade II* listed houses in London
Houses in the Royal Borough of Kensington and Chelsea
Works of Edwin Lutyens in England
Gardens by Gertrude Jekyll